Secure computing may refer to:
 Secure Computing (Company), a public computer security company acquired by McAfee.
 Computer security, information security as applied to computers and networks.